The term Swabian Turkey describes a region in southeastern in Hungary delimited by the Danube, the Drava, inhabited by an ethnic German minority, the Germans of Hungary. This present-day minority, the largest German-speaking minority in Hungary, primarily lives in the counties of Tolna, Baranya, and Somogy and are regarded as Danube Swabians.

Background 
After the Ottoman Empire was defeated in the Second Battle of Mohács in 1687, the Habsburg monarchy forced the Ottoman Turks to leave the Kingdom of Hungary. Because much of the Pannonian Plain had been depopulated during the Ottoman wars in Europe, the Habsburgs began to resettle the land with Germans, especially from Swabia.

Settlement 
German colonization in southeastern Transdanubia began in 1689. While many came from Swabia, the German settlers also came from the Rhenish Palatinate, Hesse, the Westerwald, Fulda (district), Mosel-Saar-Ruwer, Electorate of Trier, Electoral Palatinate, Bavaria, and throughout Franconia. Because of the many Swabian colonists from Upper Swabia, northern Lake Constance, upper Danube, Southern Black Forest and Principality of Fürstenberg settling on land previously controlled by the Turks, the region of Tolna, Somogy and Baranya counties became known as Swabian Turkey. The settlers were often induced to immigrate to Hungary with the promise of three years without taxes. The vast majority of German settlement was organized by private ventures run by the nobility or the Roman Catholic Church. Most of the German settlement was in pre-existing Slav- or Magyar-inhabited villages, but some new villages were also founded by Germans. The only two German-founded villages remaining in Swabian Turkey that were established by state ventures were Dunakömlőd and Németkér. Germans also settled extensively in the major towns of Pécs and Mohács. Swabian Turkey is also referred to as Little Hesse, because many of the Germans settlers in the Baranya were from Hesse, especially from Fulda. Their descendants are called Stifolders.

Post-World War II 
During the expulsion of Germans after World War II, many Germans from Swabian Turkey were expelled from their homes and replaced with Hungarians evicted from Czechoslovakia; the remaining Germans were often persecuted by the communist government. After the Fall of Communism in 1989, the Danube Swabians received minority rights, organisations, schools, and local councils and maintained their own regional dialect of German. However, the Germans are gradually being assimilated.

See also 
 Danube Swabians

References 

 Krallert, Wilfried. . Bielefeld: Velhagen & Klasing, 1958.

External links 
 Swabian Turkey at Genealogy.net
 Former German-inhabited villages in Swabian Turkey
 Map of Swabian Turkey 
 Danube Swabian Resources 

German diaspora in Europe
Danube Swabian communities
Historical regions in the Kingdom of Hungary